Monique Williams (born 23 September 1985) is a New Zealand sprinter from Tokoroa.

Williams became the first New Zealand female sprinter to win a gold medal at a major world championship event, when she won the 200 m at the World University Games (Universiade) in Belgrade during 2009.

In doing so she became only the second Kiwi sprinter to win gold at a world event, after Don Jowett won the 220 yards at the 1954 British Empire and Commonwealth Games.

Williams was selected as the flag Bearer for New Zealand at the 2009 Universiade.

During her development years, in 2006 she was awarded a New Zealand Prime Minister's Scholarship from Helen Clark, recognising Williams as an emerging and talented New Zealander.  Williams won three consecutive New Zealand Athletics titles in the 100, 200 and 400 m in 2007, 2008 and 2009.

Williams holds the New Zealand national record for 200 m (22.90s), which she set at the IAAF 2009 World Championships in Athletics in Berlin, eclipsing her previous record of 22.98 in February that year and 22.96 in the opening heats in Berlin. The New Zealand national record had stood for almost 31 years, before it was first broken by Williams.

In 2009 Williams was named Auckland's North Shore Sports Personality of the Year and was short-listed for the Halberg Awards.

Williams graduated from Waikato University with a Bachelor of Education in primary school teaching and is a qualified primary school teacher.

Achievements

Personal bests

References

External links

New Zealand Champions

Living people
1985 births
New Zealand female sprinters
Sportspeople from Tokoroa
Athletes (track and field) at the 2010 Commonwealth Games
Universiade medalists in athletics (track and field)
Universiade gold medalists for New Zealand
Medalists at the 2007 Summer Universiade
Medalists at the 2009 Summer Universiade
Commonwealth Games competitors for New Zealand
People educated at Forest View High School, Tokoroa